Ulla von Brandenburg (born 1974 in Karlsruhe) is a German artist. She lives and works in Paris.

She shows her work internationally and is one of the four finalists nominated for the Marcel Duchamp Prize in 2016.

Background 
Ulla von Brandenburg was trained in Germany at Karlsruhe University of Arts and Design in scenography. She also studied visual arts at the University of Fine Arts of Hamburg.

Artistic approach 
Ulla von Brandenburg's work is inspired by literature, theater and psychoanalysis. She is interested in the iconography of the XIX Century, in the history of technology and in the industrial revolution.

She uses a wide variety of media and techniques, including video, performance, theater, mural painting, drawing  and fabric layouts. Ulla von Brandenburg declares that "I get the idea for a work at the same time as the appropriate format for that work".

If she favors black and white for her videos, it is in colour that her visual works are expressed. An architectural colour for her curtains, installations of fabrics, pictures of ribbons with shimmering fabrics or even coloured paper cut. A faded colour for her watercolors of ghostly characters.

Ulla von Brandenburg's works raise the matter of representation and it is through the style and language of theater and scenography that she builds many of her projects. The scenic elements, the curtains of the Commedia dell'arte, the costumes of Harlequin, and so on, are all references that allow her works to go from reality to fiction or illusion.  

Her installations unfold like decorations that are often perceived by inverting the setting and in which one enter through curtains. The curtain is a fundamental motif in her work, which she describes as follows: "As the mirror has two sides, the one that reflects us and the one that is hidden behind, the curtain has two sides too. At the circus you can fold it up in a very small size and unfold it to bring a marquee out of it. I like to camouflage or change the space with poor or very simple means to create an elsewhere. Fabric is the ideal medium, inexpensive, easy to transport, modular. It’s a nomadic material."

The other recurring motif of her work is the forest, that can be found in her videos (such as Chorspiel) and her works in cut wallpaper. As with the curtain, this motif does not refer to a particular subject, but it refers "as much to Wagner and to Germany as to Tarkovski and to a common culture. Everywhere it corresponds to a universe, to tales, to the unconscious... ".

Her performances, in public or video, reveal the different facets of Ulla von Brandenburg's work: she writes the texts and the songs, she designs sets and costumes, chooses and directs the actors.

In February 2019, an exhibition at the Musée régional d'Art contemporain Occitanie, in Sérignan (Hérault), she presents her portraits of committed, learned and militant women.

Personal exhibitions 

 2005 : 
 Künstlerstätte Schloss Bleckede, Germany
 Der Brief, installation in public space, Berlin
 I am making a crazy quilt and I want your face for the center, Pavilion Project, Montreal
 Fuenf sind’s doch schon im ersten Spiel, Trottoir, Hamburg 
 2006 : 
 Cinq milliards d’années, Module 1, Palais de Tokyo, Paris
 Kunsthalle, Zürich, Switzerland
 2007 : 
 Karo Sieben, Galerie Art: Concept, Paris
 Brief Oder Neuigkeiten, Produzentengalerie, Hamburg
 2008 : 
 Whose beginning is not, nor end cannot be, Dublin
 Project Space PS1, New York
 Art Unlimited, Art 39 Basel
 Passengers: 1.8: Ulla Von Brandenburg, CCA Wattis Institute for Contemporary Arts, San Francisco
 Ulla von Brandenburg ? Wo über dem Grün ein rotes Netz liegt, Düsseldorf
 La Maison, Docking Station project Space au Stedelijk Museum, Amsterdam
 2009
 Name or Number, Plateau - Frac Île-de-France, Paris
 Wagon Wheel, Pilar Corrias Gallery, London
 Chisenhale Gallery, London
 2010 : 
 Neue Alte Welt, Galerie Art: Concept, Paris
 Chorspiel, Lilith Performance Studio, Malmö, Sweden
 K21 Kunstsammlung Nordrhein-Westfalen, Düsseldorf
 Galerie Saint-Séverin, Paris
 2011 : 
 Das Versteck des W.L, Produzentengalerie, Hamburg
 Vitrine de l’Antenne, Frac Île-de-France, Paris
 Neue Alte Welt, The Common Guild, Glasgow
 2012 : 
 Mirrorsong, Pilar Corrias Gallery, London
 Le Chevalier inexistant, Rosascape, Paris
 2013 : 
 Death of a King au Palais de Tokyo, Paris
 Die Straße, Galerie Art: Concept, Paris
 Innen ist nicht Aussen, Secession, Vienne 
 Kunstpreis Finkenwerder, Kunsthaus, Hamburg
 Prospectif Cinéma, Centre Pompidou, Paris
 Das Wertesck des W.L, Kunsthalle, Hamburger
 Gleich, Gleich, Gleich, Kiosk, Gent, Belgium
 Eigenschatten - Ombra Propria, Monitor, Rome
 Following the Signs, Herzliya Museum, Herzliya, Israel
 2014 : 
 24 Filme, kein Schnitt, MAMCO, Genève, Genève 
 Inside is not outside, Kunstverein Hanover
 2015 : 
 Zuvor wie Vorher, Produzentengalerie, Hamburg
 Baisse-toi montagne, Lève-toi vallon au Kaaitheater, Bruxelles
 Gestern ist auch morgen und heute ist wie hier, Kunstverein Kassel 
 Kalns, grimsti ! Ieleja celies ! (Baisse-toi montagne, Lève-toi vallon), kim? Contemporary Art Centre, Riga, Latvia 
 Ulla von Brandenburg : Objects Without Shadow, Pilar Corrias Gallery, London
 Sink down mountain, Rise up valley, Performa, New York 
 2016 :
Orange meets blue, Kasia Michalski Gallery, Varsovie, Pologne
It Has a Golden Orange Sun and an Elderly Blue Moon, Darling Foundry, Canada
 Sink down mountain, Rise up valley, The Common Guild, Glasgow, United Kingdom 
 Manchmal Ja, manchmal Nein, Haus Konstruktiv, Zürich, Switzerland 
2018 :                                                          
Ulla von Brandenburg: Sweet Feast, Whitechapel Gallery, United Kingdom  
2020 : 
 Das Was Ist, Palais de Tokyo, Paris

Awards 
 Begabtenstipendium der Dietzte-Stiftung, 2003
 Reisestipendium, Verein für Neue Kunst in Hamburg Stipendium Künstlerstätte Schloss Bleckede, 2005
 Juergen-Ponto-Stipendium, 2006
 Kunstpreis der Böttcherstraße in Bremen, 2007
 Finkenwerder Art Prize, 2013
 In 2016, she is one of the four finalists nominated for Marcel Duchamp Prize
 Kubus. Sparda-Kunstpreis, 2022

References 

German contemporary artists
1974 births
Living people